Tobias Scheifler (born 18 September 1988) is a German former professional footballer who played as a midfielder.

Career
Scheifler made his professional debut in the 3. Liga for VfR Aalen on 23 August 2008, coming on as a substitute in the 71st minute for Christoph Teinert in the 2–0 home loss against Rot-Weiß Erfurt.

In 2013 he joined Oberliga club FSV Hollenbach.

References

External links
 
 

1988 births
Living people
People from Friedrichshafen
Sportspeople from Tübingen (region)
Footballers from Baden-Württemberg
German footballers
Association football midfielders
3. Liga players
Regionalliga players
VfR Aalen players
FV Ravensburg players
German expatriate footballers
German expatriate sportspeople in Austria
Expatriate footballers in Austria